Anahita Zahedifar ( born 16 January 2003) is an Iranian chess player. She is a Woman FIDE Master (WFM) since 2015. She is ranked best female U18 in Iran, 8th female U18 in Asia, and 32nd female U18 in the world. Her highest rating was 2213 (in January 2020).

She won the Women Iranian Chess Championship in 2019, with 8.5 points out of 11 rounds.

She won the

 Iran U-12 Girls Championship in 2014 with score of 8/9.
 Asian Nations Cup U-14 Chess Team Championship and won 1st place alongside Arash Daghli, Mehdi Gholami, Seyed Kian Pourmousavai and Borna Derakhshani.
 2016 World Youth U16 Chess Olympiad and won 1st place playing Board 5 alongside Parham Maghsoodloo, Alireza Firouzja, FM Aryan Gholami, Arash Tahbaz, and team captain Khosro Harandi.

She played in the women chess olympiad in 2018.

References

2003 births
Living people
Iranian chess players
Chess Woman FIDE Masters